The 1937 Swedish Ice Hockey Championship was the 16th season of the Swedish Ice Hockey Championship, the national championship of Sweden. Hammarby IF won the championship.

Tournament

First round
 Nacka SK - UoIF Matteuspojkarna 3:1
 Tranebergs IF - Hornstulls IF 3:2
 Södertälje SK - BK Nordia 4:0

Second round 
 Södertälje IF - IFK Mariefred 3:2
 Karlbergs BK - IK Sture 2:1
 Nacka SK - Lidingö IF 4:0
 Södertälje SK - Tranebergs IF 3:1

Quarterfinals 
 Södertälje IF - Nacka SK 4:0
 Hammarby IF - IK Göta 3:0
 AIK - IK Hermes 1:0
 Södertälje SK - Karlbergs BK 3:1

Semifinals 
 Södertälje IF - Hammarby IF 0:1
 AIK - Södertälje SK 1:3

Final 
  Hammarby IF - Södertälje SK 1:0

External links
 Season on hockeyarchives.info

Cham
Swedish Ice Hockey Championship seasons